Paul Gray may refer to:

Paul Gray (American musician) (1972–2010), bassist of heavy metal band Slipknot
Paul Gray (civil servant) (born 1948), former chairman of HM Revenue & Customs, a British government department
Paul Gray (English musician) (born 1958), bassist of The Damned
Paul Gray (hurdler) (born 1969), British hurdler
Paul Gray (footballer) (born 1970), Northern Irish former footballer
Paul Gray (information technology) (1930–2012), pioneer in the IT field
Paul Gray (skier) (born 1969), Australian Olympic skier
Paul Gray (songwriter) (1963–2018), Australian singer, songwriter, record producer, frontman for the pop band Wa Wa Nee
Paul E. Gray (1932–2017), fourteenth president of MIT
Paul R. Gray, Berkeley professor, integrated circuits, IEEE W.R.G. Baker Award